Cristian Olivares may refer to:

Cristian Olivares (footballer, born 1976), Chilean football attacking midfielder
Cristian Olivares (footballer, born 1980), Chilean football coach and former defender